Seven Years of Good Luck is a 1942 German comedy film directed by Ernst Marischka and starring Wolf Albach-Retty, Theo Lingen and Hans Moser. It is a sequel to the 1940 film Seven Years Hard Luck.

It was shot at the Cinecittà Studios in Rome. The film's sets were designed by the art director Piero Filippone. A separate Italian version Seven Years of Happiness was also released.

Cast
In alphabetical order
 Wolf Albach-Retty as Heinz Kersten
 Theo Lingen as Paul Griebling
 Hans Moser as Dr. August Teisinger
 Rio Nobile
 Elli Parvo as Melitta
 Hannelore Schroth as Hella Jüttner
 Oskar Sima

References

Bibliography
 Bock, Hans-Michael & Bergfelder, Tim. The Concise CineGraph. Encyclopedia of German Cinema. Berghahn Books, 2009.
 Von Dassanowsky, Robert. Austrian Cinema. McFarland & Co, 2005.

External links 
 

1942 films
1942 comedy films
1940s multilingual films
German comedy films
Films of Nazi Germany
1940s German-language films
Films directed by Ernst Marischka
Films shot in Rome
German multilingual films
German sequel films
Bavaria Film films
Films shot at Cinecittà Studios
German black-and-white films
1940s German films